The following is a list of the chiefs of the Clan Fraser of Lovat, in chronological order. The Chiefs of Clan Fraser often use the Gaelic patronym MacShimidh, meaning Son of Simon. Simon is the favoured family name for the Chiefs of Clan Fraser. They are often numbered 1st MacShimidh, 2nd MacShimidh, 3rd MacShimidh, etc. There is some debate on where exactly the numbering should start, as Fraser ties to Lovat land go back at least as far as 1253. The line does not necessarily represent a direct line of descent, though most Chiefs took on their responsibility upon the death of their father.

Frasers of Lovat
 Sir Simon Fraser (d. 1306) (hanged, drawn and quartered in London)
 Sir Andrew Fraser (d. 1308)
 Simon Fraser (killed 1333 at the Battle of Halidon Hill)
 Simon Fraser (killed 1347)
 Hugh Fraser of Lovat (d. 1397)
 Alexander Fraser (d. 1415)
 Hugh Fraser (d. 1440)
 Hugh Fraser (c.1417-1450)
 Hugh Fraser, 1st Lord Lovat (c.1436-1501)
 Thomas Fraser, 2nd Lord Lovat (c.1461-1524)
 Hugh Fraser, 3rd Lord Lovat (c.1494-1544) (killed at the Battle of the Shirts)
 Alexander Fraser, 4th Lord Lovat (c.1527-1557)
 Hugh Fraser, 5th Lord Lovat (c.1545-1576)
 Simon Fraser, 6th Lord Lovat (1570-1633)
 Hugh Fraser, 7th Lord Lovat (1591-1646)
 Hugh Fraser, 8th Lord Lovat (1643–1672)
 Hugh Fraser, 9th Lord Lovat (1666–1696)
 Thomas Fraser, 10th Lord Lovat (1631–1699)
 Simon Fraser, 11th Lord Lovat (c. 1667-1747) ("The Fox", executed for being a Jacobite rebel)
 General Simon Fraser of Lovat (1726-1782)
 Archibald Campbell Fraser of Lovat (1736-1815)

Frasers of Strichen, now Lovat

Two Chiefs dispute

On May 1, 1984, by decree of the Court of the Lord Lyon, the 21st Lady Saltoun was made "Chief of the name and arms of the whole Clan Fraser". The Lord Lyon did not grant the Chiefship of the Clan Fraser, simply a description of "Chief of the name and arms." The Lord Lyon does not have power over the Chiefship of a Highland Clan. Since this decree, there has been much confusion as to the Chiefship of the Clan Fraser.

When Simon the Pater's descendants first acquired the Lovat lands of the Ard, in the Highlands, they took to the Gaelic customs of the area. This included everything from language, ways of warfare, to clothing and fashion, even giving their children Gaelic names. By the time Simon's son came of age to lead the family, he was deemed to be the 1st Chief of Clan Fraser, the MacShimidh.

Frasers who stayed in the Lowlands, however, maintained Teutonic (Germanic), or Norman culture. They took no part in Clan warfare, spoke Scots, and dressed like Lowlanders. According to Alexander Fraser, 18th Lord Saltoun, his family "continued to have their principal seat in the Lowlands, and those of the surname who remained in that section of Scotland, where Teutonic institutions prevailed, and whence the patriarchal system of Clans and Clanships had long been banished, had nothing to do with the origin or formation of the Highland Clan, and never belonged to it."

According to the Lady Saltoun, his descendant,
"The Frasers of Philorth, the Lords Saltoun, being the senior line, are Chiefs of the name of Fraser, although a lowland family. Lord Lovat is Chief of the very numerous Highland Clan Fraser of Lovat, based in Inverness-shire." 

The Lady Saltoun is not a descendant of the Shimidh, the Simon from whom the Clan Fraser traces its lineage, being descended from the Shimidh's older brother. So, though the Lord Lovat is still the Chieftain of Clan Fraser, the MacShimidh, the Lord Lyon has made official the seniority of the Lady Saltoun's line.

The selection of a clan chieftain is traditionally very different than the Teutonic/Norman system of inherited titles. A Clan would elect and follow whatever chief it chose. The Lyon Court decree has introduced a lack of clarity into the Clan's organisation. Frasers differ on the matter, but most Lovats still regard the Lord Lovat as their chief, while many lowland Frasers, who adhere to the romanticised view of Clans and the Highlands, are happy to have found a way to link themselves to Highland culture. Opinions vary, but Frasers tend to respect each other as fellow Frasers, regardless of where they come from.

Arms of the Lords Lovat, Chiefs of the Clan Fraser of Lovat

See also
Lord Lovat
Lord Saltoun
Scottish clan chief

Notes

References
 J.R. Harper. The Fraser Highlanders. The Society of The Montreal Military & Maritime Museum, Montreal, 1979.

Clan Fraser
Fraser